From 1989 to 2010, the National Hydrogen Association (NHA) was a nonprofit organization focused on advancing the development of hydrogen technologies and their utilization in industrial, commercial, and consumer applications and promote the role of hydrogen in the energy field.

The NHA was a member-based organization and hosted the annual Hydrogen Conference. NHA also provided advocacy on behalf of the stakeholders in the hydrogen economy and worked to support legislation enabling the entry of hydrogen technologies to the marketplace.

In October 2010, the NHA merged with the U.S. Fuel Cell Council to form the Fuel Cell and Hydrogen Energy Association.

References

Hydrogen economy organizations